Ḉ (minuscule: ḉ) is a Latin script letter formed from C with added acute accent and cedilla.

Usage 

It is used in the Estonian KNAB transliteration standard when representing Cyrillic letters of several Northwest Caucasian languages. In transliteration of Abaza, it represents the letter ЧӀ. In transliteration of Abkhaz, it represents the letter Ҷ. In transliteration of Adyghe, it represents the letter КӀ.

Unicode 

References 

Letters with cedilla
Letters with acute